Yahya Genc (born 3 August 1974) is an Austrian football manager and former player.

External links
 

1974 births
Living people
Austrian footballers
Austrian football managers
FC Blau-Weiß Linz players
Association football defenders